Charles E. Gannon is a novelist and game designer who has worked primarily on hard science-fiction and role-playing games.

Career
Charles Gannon wrote Hard Times (1991), a MegaTraveller book which pushed the background metaplot up by six years. Gannon wrote many articles in Challenge magazine about "The Hinterworlds", a sector of space in the Imperium of the Traveller universe.

Gannon has also co-written novels in the 1632 series with Eric Flint, including 1635: The Papal Stakes (2012), 1636: Commander Cantrell in the West Indies (2014), and 1636: The Vatican Sanction (2015). His novels Fire with Fire and Trial by Fire were both nominated for the Nebula Award for Best Novel (in 2014 and 2015 respectively). He was nominated again in 2016 for Raising Caine, and in 2020 for Marque of Caine.

Bibliography

Tales of the Terran Republic 
This progression of books is also known as the "Caine Riordan series" or the "22nd Century series"
 
 
 
 
 
 
  (upcoming)

Spinoffs and related fiction 
  
  
 
 
 Triage (with Eric Flint; upcoming)
 Misbegotten (upcoming) a non-mainline Terran Republic novel

Vortex of Worlds

Starfire series

The 1632 series

Black Tide Rising

References

External links

 
 
 Charles E. Gannon :: Pen & Paper RPG Database archive
 

1960 births
20th-century American male writers
20th-century American novelists
21st-century American male writers
21st-century American novelists
American male novelists
Living people
Role-playing game designers